Scapular of the Passion can refer to
Red Scapular of the Passion
Black Scapular of the Passion